Nomius may refer to:

Nomius, a Roman epithet for Apollo
Nomius (genus), a genus of ground beetles